Megan Ruth Marshack (born October 31, 1953) is an American television news writer and producer who served as an aide to former Vice President Nelson Rockefeller and was with him when he died on January 26, 1979.

Biography
Born in California, Marshack worked on Rockefeller's vice-presidential staff, in Washington, D.C., for two years.  There was speculation in the press regarding the nature of the relationship between Rockefeller and Marshack. For example, long-time Rockefeller aide Joseph E. Persico claimed in the PBS documentary about the Rockefeller family, "It became known that he had been alone with a young woman who worked for him, in undeniably intimate circumstances, and in the course of that evening had died from a heart attack." News organizations widely reported that Marshack was a named beneficiary in his will, though the bulk of his estate was left to his wife with other large gifts going to museums.

Prior to her employment with Rockefeller, she was a radio news reporter for the Associated Press.

Marshack has remained largely out of the public eye since 1979. For about a year after Rockefeller died, she dated cartoonist Charles Addams, who lived in the same apartment building as she did.

In 1992, it was reported that she was still living in New York working as a news writer for WCBS-TV, but The Washington Post noted she declined to comment, saying  "I don't do interviews." According to newspapers in September 1994, she was a news writer and producer at WCBS-TV. In December 2008, Parade reported that Marshack married a journalist and was living in Southern California.

References

American women journalists
American people of German descent
Rockefeller family
Writers from New York City
Writers from Los Angeles
1953 births
Living people